USS Shark (SS-314), a , was the sixth ship of the United States Navy to be named for the shark, a large marine predator.

Construction began in 1943 and commissioning occurred in 1944.  Following shakedown, Shark was deployed to the Pacific where she attacked ships and rescued downed airmen. Shark was sunk on its third patrol by a Japanese destroyer on 24 October 1944. In the engagement in which it was sunk, Shark torpedoed and sank the Japanese freighter . Arisan Maru was transporting captured Americans but carried no markings or flag indicating this. The Americans had no way of recognizing Arisan Maru was a prison ship.  The sinking of Arisan Maru is the greatest loss of American life in a single military sinking.

History 
Her keel was laid down by the Electric Boat Company in Groton, Connecticut, on 28 January 1943. She was launched on 17 October 1943 (sponsored by Mrs. Lera Millard Thomas, the wife of Albert Thomas, the United States Congressman from the Eighth District of Texas), and commissioned on 14 February 1944.

Following shakedown off New London, Connecticut, Shark transited the Panama Canal and arrived at Pearl Harbor on 24 April 1944 for final training in the Hawaiian area. Early on the morning of 2 June, Shark submerged ahead of an enemy convoy and fired a spread of torpedoes at a Japanese tanker. Although all missed the original target, the torpedoes continued on to hit and sink another enemy vessel, the 4,700-ton cargo ship, Chiyo Maru. After evading an ensuing depth charge attack, the submarine continued her patrol.

On 4 June, Shark began tracking another heavily escorted convoy, and, in maneuvering for attack, encountered a patrolling destroyer dead ahead. She was rewarded with four solid hits that quickly sent Katsukawa Maru to the bottom. After escaping from the aroused escort ships, Shark surfaced and continued the chase. She caught up with the convoy on the afternoon of 5 June, and after nightfall, let go a spread of six torpedoes which sank the 3,080-ton freighter Tamahime Maru and the 7,006-ton passenger-cargo ship Takoka Maru. Shark again evaded the escort ships, then surfaced near midnight, but was unable to catch up with the convoy. The remainder of the patrol was uneventful, and the submarine returned to Midway Island for refit on 17 June.

Shark put to sea on 10 July for her second war patrol, this time in the waters off the Volcano Islands and Bonin Islands. On 19 July, she launched four torpedoes at an enemy convoy, but they missed their mark as the convoy made a sharp "zig" away. On 1 August, Shark was again frustrated in an attack on a Japanese convoy when, while moving into firing position, three escorts forced her to take evasive action, allowing the convoy to escape. The following afternoon, the submarine set course for Iwo Jima where she took up lifeguard station in support of carrier airstrikes.

On the afternoon of 4 August, Shark rescued two airmen from a crashed  Curtiss SB2C Helldiver from AG19 piloted by William S. Emerson. She terminated her lifeguard duties on 19 August and touched at Midway Island before arriving at Pearl Harbor ten days later.

On 24 October, Seadragon received a message from Shark stating that she had made radar contact with a single freighter, and she was going in to attack. This was the last message received from the submarine. She was reported as presumed lost on 27 November.

After making radar contact, Shark was in pursuit of a single freighter. At approximately 5:00 pm on 24 October 1944 in the Bashi Straits, South China Sea, latitude 20°46'N, longitude 118°18' E, the 6,886-ton Japanese freighter  was sunk. Arisan Maru carried no markings or flag to indicate that it was carrying Allied prisoners of war. The Americans had no way of recognizing Arisan Maru was a prison ship. The torpedo launched from Shark hit aft of midships causing Arisan Maru to split in two.

Naval records indicate that Shark was lost with all 87 hands in the same battle after having torpedoed Arisan Maru. "Regardless of the final count, the sinking of the Arisan Maru still represents the greatest loss of American life in a single military sinking."

Shark received one battle star for World War II service.

Japanese records examined after the war indicate that on 24 October 1944, in Luzon Strait,  made contact with a submerged submarine and dropped depth charges. After losing and regaining the contact, the destroyer dropped another 17 depth charges which resulted in "bubbles, heavy oil, clothes and cork" coming to the surface.

She was the second U.S. submarine named Shark to be sunk during the war.  was sunk in early February 1942.

Trivia
 The novel Up Periscope is about a US Navy submarine "USS Shark".

References

External links 
 
 On Eternal Patrol: USS Shark

 

Balao-class submarines
World War II submarines of the United States
Lost submarines of the United States
Shipwrecks of the Philippines
Ships built in Groton, Connecticut
1943 ships
World War II shipwrecks in the Pacific Ocean
Ships lost with all hands
Maritime incidents in October 1944
Submarines sunk by Japanese warships